Tagebuch einer Gänsemutter (German for Diary of a Geese Mother) is a 14-episode German TV documentary from 1989 about Angelika Hofer, a woman who raised ten geese. After the geese hatch, Hofer raises them, takes them to a lake and teaches them how to fly.

See also
List of German television series

1989 German television series debuts
1989 German television series endings
German documentary television series
Television series about birds
German-language television shows
Das Erste original programming